Anokha is a 1975 Hindi-language action drama film directed by Jugal Kishore. It is one of the first film where Shatrughan Sinha signed as a hero.

Cast
 Shatrughan Sinha - Ram/Anokha/Shambu Khanna
 Zarina Wahab - Sudha Manchanda
 A.K. Hangal 
 Jeevan
 Kanhaiyalal
 Jayshree T.
 Paintal
 Meena T.
 Imtiaz Khan

Music

External links

References

1975 films
1970s Hindi-language films
Films scored by Kalyanji Anandji
Indian action drama films